Paddock Township, Nebraska may refer to the following places:

Paddock Township, Gage County, Nebraska
Paddock Township, Holt County, Nebraska

Nebraska township disambiguation pages